Interleukin 18 receptor accessory protein, also known as IL18RAP and CDw218b (cluster of differentiation w218b), is a human gene.

Function
The protein encoded by this gene is an accessory subunit of the heterodimeric receptor for IL18. This protein enhances the IL18 binding activity of IL18R1 (IL1RRP), a ligand binding subunit of IL18 receptor. The coexpression of IL18R1 and this protein is required for the activation of NF-κB and MAPK8 (JNK) in response to IL18.

Disease association
Variants at IL18RAP have been linked to susceptibility to Coeliac disease.

See also
 Interleukin-18 receptor

References

Further reading

External links
 

Clusters of differentiation